Rudolf Zehetgruber (born 16 September 1926) is an Austrian film director, producer, screenwriter and actor who directed 17 films between 1960 and 1985. He is most known for writing and directing the Superbug/Dudu film series that featured his wife Kathrin Oginski (Barbara Kathrin Zehetgruber) and two entries in the Kommissar X film series.

Selected filmography

 The Congress Dances (directed by Franz Antel, 1955)
 The Bashful Elephant (1961)
 The Black Cobra (1963)
 Piccadilly Zero Hour 12 (1963)
  (1964)
 The Secret of the Chinese Carnation (1964)
 Seven Vengeful Women (1966)
 Kommissar X: Three Yellow Cats (Death is Nimble, Death is Quick, 1966)
 Kommissar X – Drei grüne Hunde (1967)
The Love Bug Rally (the first Superbug film, 1971)
Superbug, Super Agent (1972)
The Superbug on Extratour (1973)
The Maddest Car in the World (1975)
Son of Superbug (1979)
 (1985)

External links

1926 births
Living people
Austrian film directors
Austrian screenwriters
Austrian male screenwriters
Austrian male film actors
Austrian film producers
German-language film directors
Male actors from Vienna
Writers from Vienna